Thanh Bình is a rural district of Đồng Tháp province in the Mekong Delta region of Vietnam. As of 2003, the district had a population of 158,203, rising to 162,130 in 2004. The district covers an area of 329 km². The district capital lies at Thanh Bình.

Divisions
The district is divided into one urban ward and 11 communes:

Thanh Bình (ward), Bình Thành, Tân Mỹ, Phú Lợi, Tân Phú, Tân Thạnh, An Phong, Tân Long, Tân Quới, Tân Hoà, Tân Huề and Tân Bình.

References

Districts of Đồng Tháp province